Marinomonas blandensis is a Gram-negative, strictly aerobic, moderately halophilic and chemoorganotrophic bacterium from the genus of Marinomonas which has been isolated from seawater from the Blanes Bay Microbial Observatory from the Mediterranean Sea.

References

External links
Type strain of Marinomonas blandensis at BacDive -  the Bacterial Diversity Metadatabase

Oceanospirillales
Bacteria described in 2016